Majid Gholamnejad (June 18, 1983 – September 14, 2018) was an Iranian football midfielder
He was found dead on September 14, 2018, in a river in Siyahu after a heart attack.

Club career

Club career statistics

 Assist Goals

International career

Gholamnejad was called up to the Iran national football team ahead of a FIFA World Cup qualifier against Kuwait. Gholamnejad debuted for the national team coming on as a 61st-minute substitute against Bahrain in a 1-0 defeat.

International goals

Scores and results list Iran's goal tally first.

Honours

Club
Iran's Premier Football League (1): 2006–07

National
WAFF Championship (1): 2008

References

1983 births
2018 deaths
Iranian footballers
Iran international footballers
Persian Gulf Pro League players
Saipa F.C. players
Association football midfielders
Pas players
Esteghlal F.C. players
Sportspeople from Tehran